The 2008 National League Championship Series (NLCS), the second round of the 2008 National League playoffs, was a best-of-seven baseball game series. The series matched the NL West Champion Los Angeles Dodgers against the NL East Champion Philadelphia Phillies, who had home field advantage for this series due to their better regular-season record. The teams split their season series, with the home team sweeping their two four-game series in August. 

This series marked the first postseason meeting for the Phillies and Dodgers since the 1983 NLCS, which Philadelphia won 3–1 en route to a loss to Baltimore in the World Series. It also marked the first NLCS for both teams since the Division Series was instituted in 1995. Overall, this was the fourth time these two teams had met in the postseason. Prior to the 1983 NLCS, the Dodgers had defeated the Phillies 3–1 in the NLCS during both the 1977 and 1978 post-seasons.

The series opened on Thursday, October 9, 2008 at Citizens Bank Park in Philadelphia, with the series being telecast on Fox.

The Phillies won the series, four games to one. They would go on to defeat the Tampa Bay Rays in the World Series in five games.

Background
The Philadelphia Phillies (92-70, NL East Champions) featured an experienced line-up and stellar defense to go with a capable pitching staff. Statistical leaders in batting for the 2008 team included center fielder Shane Victorino (batting average, .293), first baseman Ryan Howard (home runs, 48; runs batted in, 146), and second baseman Chase Utley (runs scored, 113). For their accomplishments, Howard won the Josh Gibson Award for the National League, and Utley won his third consecutive Silver Slugger Award. Pitching leaders included left-handed starting pitcher Cole Hamels (innings pitched, 227), left-hander starter Jamie Moyer (wins, 16), and right-handed relief pitcher Brad Lidge (saves, 41). Like the 2007 Phillies, the 2008 team took advantage of another New York Mets' September collapse. 

The Los Angeles Dodgers (84-78, NL West Champions) were a mediocre, underachieving team until a Christmas present arrived early in the form of one LF, Manny Ramirez. The trade deadline move gave Los Angeles arguably the best-right handed hitter in Major League Baseball and a dominant force in the middle of their lineup. Ramirez hit .396 with 17 HRs in 53 games after the trade on July 31st. To go along with Manny, youth was featured throughout the Dodgers line-up, such as All-Star catcher Russell Martin, first baseman James Loney, right fielder Andre Ethier, center fielder Matt Kemp, and third baseman Blake DeWitt. Los Angeles was hot coming into the NLCS, having won 17-8 games in September and sweeping the Cubs in the NLDS.

Summary

Philadelphia Phillies vs. Los Angeles Dodgers

Game summaries

Game 1
Thursday, October 9, 2008 8:23 PM ET at Citizens Bank Park in Philadelphia, Pennsylvania

Derek Lowe and Cole Hamels faced each other at Citizens Bank Park for Game 1. In the first inning, Manny Ramírez missed a home run by mere feet to center field and settled for an RBI double to give LA a 1–0 lead, and later in the fourth, Matt Kemp scored on a sacrifice fly by Blake DeWitt. However, in the sixth inning, as Lowe was rolling, a throwing error by Dodgers shortstop Rafael Furcal put Shane Victorino on second base, apparently breaking the momentum for Lowe, who on the next pitch surrendered a home run to Chase Utley that tied the score. After a Ryan Howard groundout, Pat Burrell homered to left and put the Phillies out front 3–2, and that would prove to be the final score. Brad Lidge tossed a perfect ninth for the save.

Game 2
Friday, October 10, 2008 4:35 PM ET at Citizens Bank Park in Philadelphia, Pennsylvania

Philadelphia starting pitcher Brett Myers surprisingly batted 3-for-3 with three RBIs as the Phillies opened up an 8–2 lead on the Dodgers, chasing Dodgers starter Chad Billingsley in the third inning. Billingsley was also criticized for not retaliating for inside pitching by Myers, a response that would have to wait until Game 3 by Dodgers starter Hiroki Kuroda. The Phillies batted through their whole lineup in both the second and third innings, scoring four runs in each. Manny Ramírez made things closer with a three-run home run off Myers in the fourth, but in the seventh Casey Blake was robbed of a potential bases clearing hit in deep left center by a leaping Shane Victorino. Four Phillies relievers pitched scoreless baseball in four innings of work with Brad Lidge remaining perfect in save opportunities in the regular season and postseason. Before the game Charlie Manuel learned that his mother died, and Shane Victorino learned that his grandmother died the same day after the game.

Game 3

Sunday, October 12, 2008 8:24 PM ET at Dodger Stadium in Los Angeles, California

The first game at Dodger Stadium in the series, Game 3 saw a dramatic benches-clearing incident in the third inning, after Dodgers starter Hiroki Kuroda threw a fastball over the head of the Phillies' Shane Victorino. This came in apparent retaliation for Phillies starter Jamie Moyer hitting Dodgers catcher Russell Martin in the knee in the first inning and reliever Clay Condrey nearly hitting Martin again in the second, which came after Brett Myers nearly hit Martin and threw behind Manny Ramírez in Game 2. In a wild first inning, five Dodgers scored, mostly in part due to a three-run triple by Blake DeWitt, and Rafael Furcal homered in the second, his first home run since May 5, forcing Moyer to leave the game after just  innings. In the third inning confrontation, only words were exchanged and nobody was ejected, and Kuroda pitched a solid six innings to lead LA to a 7–2 victory over the Phillies, cutting their lead to 2–1. The attendance was 56,800, an all-time Dodger Stadium record.

Game 4
Monday, October 13, 2008 8:24 PM ET at Dodger Stadium in Los Angeles, California

Game 4 was a seesaw battle between the two teams. The Phillies struck first; in the top of the first they collected three hits and two runs off Derek Lowe, who started on three days' rest. In the bottom of the inning, James Loney hit a ball off the center field wall to score Rafael Furcal and cut the lead to 2–1. Starter Joe Blanton began strong, but in the fifth inning gave up two runs and forced Charlie Manuel to go to his bullpen. In the sixth, the Dodgers' bullpen faltered first, when Clayton Kershaw gave up a walk and a hit, and Chan Ho Park threw a wild pitch to tie the game. In the bottom of the sixth, Casey Blake homered to left, and with two on, a throwing error by Ryan Howard allowed Juan Pierre to score. The inning ended when Chase Utley made a diving catch and stumbled to second base for the double play. Things looked great for the Dodgers until Cory Wade relieved in the eighth and Shane Victorino hit a two-run home run that landed in the visitor's bullpen to tie the score. Jonathan Broxton came in after Carlos Ruiz singled off Wade and promptly gave up another two-run homer to pinch-hitter Matt Stairs, the veteran's first career postseason homer. Brad Lidge then came in and pitched his first save of 2008 that consisted of more than three outs, his 49th consecutive save.

Game 5
Wednesday, October 15, 2008 8:23 PM ET at Dodger Stadium in Los Angeles, California

Dodgers fans were psyched for a possible comeback in Game 5, but Jimmy Rollins spoiled the party early with a leadoff homer off Chad Billingsley, who in his second bad outing of the series was knocked out of the game in the third inning after giving up three runs. The Phillies added two more runs when Rafael Furcal committed three errors (two on the same play) in the fifth inning. Manny Ramírez, in another strong performance, did manage to bring the Dodger Stadium crowd to life with a home run in the sixth inning. However, the Dodgers never threatened after that, and the Phillies won the series in five games and their first pennant since 1993. Winning pitcher Cole Hamels was named the series MVP after winning both of his starts with a 1.93 ERA.

Composite box
2008 NLCS (4–1): Philadelphia Phillies over Los Angeles Dodgers

References

External links
2008 NLCS at Baseball Reference

National League Championship Series
National League Championship Series
Philadelphia Phillies postseason
Los Angeles Dodgers postseason
National League Championship Series
National League Championship Series
2008 in Los Angeles
2008 in Philadelphia
October 2008 sports events in the United States